The 2015 Nigerian Senate election in Kano State was held on March 28, 2015, to elect members of the Nigerian Senate to represent Kano State. Barau I Jibrin representing Kano North, Rabiu Kwankwaso representing Kano Central and Kabiru Ibrahim Gaya representing Kano South all won on the platform of All Progressives Congress.

Overview

Summary

Results

Kano North 
All Progressives Congress candidate Barau I Jibrin won the election, defeating People's Democratic Party candidate Bello Hayatu Gwarzo and other party candidates.

Kano Central 
All Progressives Congress candidate Rabiu Kwankwaso won the election, defeating People's Democratic Party candidate Basheer Garba Mohammed and other party candidates.

Kano South 
All Progressives Congress candidate Kabiru Ibrahim Gaya won the election, defeating People's Democratic Party candidate Abdullahi Sani and other party candidates.

References 

Kano State Senate elections
March 2015 events in Nigeria
Kan